The Salles des Croisades ("Hall of Crusades") is a set of rooms located in the north wing of the Palace of Versailles.

The rooms were created in the mid-19th century by king Louis-Philippe for his museum of French history, and opened in 1843, at a time when France was seized with enthusiasm with its historical past, and especially the Crusades period. The rooms are filled with over 120 paintings related to the Crusades. King Louis-Philippe included the names of the thousands of family whose ancestors went to the Crusades, encouraging many forgeries at that time.

First room paintings

Second room paintings

Third room paintings

Fourth room paintings

Fifth room paintings

Gallery

See also
 Musée de l'Histoire de France (Versailles)

References

Palace of Versailles
Individual rooms